Downtown Airport may refer to:

 Downtown Airport (Arkansas) in El Dorado, Arkansas, United States (FAA: F43)
 Downtown Airport (Missouri) in Springfield, Missouri, United States (FAA: 3DW)

Similarly named airports

 Ardmore Downtown Executive Airport in Ardmore, Oklahoma, United States (FAA: 1F0)
 Charles B. Wheeler Downtown Airport in Kansas City, Missouri, United States (FAA: MKC)
 Columbia Owens Downtown Airport in Columbia, South Carolina, United States (FAA: CUB)
 Greenville Downtown Airport in Greenville, South Carolina, United States (FAA: GMU)
 Kickapoo Downtown Airport in Wichita Falls, Texas, United States (FAA: CWC)
 Knoxville Downtown Island Airport in Knoxville, Tennessee, United States (FAA: DKX)
 Macon Downtown Airport in Macon, Georgia, United States (FAA: MAC)
 Mobile Downtown Airport in Mobile, Alabama, United States (FAA: BFM)
 Rolla Downtown Airport in Rolla, Missouri, United States (FAA: K07)
 St. Paul Downtown Airport in St. Paul, Minnesota, United States (FAA: STP)
 St. Louis Downtown Airport in Cahokia, Illinois, United States (FAA: CPS)
 Shreveport Downtown Airport in Shreveport, Louisiana, United States (FAA: DTN)
 Spartanburg Downtown Memorial Airport in Spartanburg, South Carolina, United States (FAA: SPA)
 Wausau Downtown Airport in Wausau, Wisconsin, United States (FAA: AUW)